CGS-20625 is an anxiolytic drug used in scientific research. It has similar effects to benzodiazepine drugs, but is structurally distinct and so is classed as a nonbenzodiazepine anxiolytic. It produces anxiolytic and anticonvulsant effects, but with no sedative effects even at high doses, and no significant muscle relaxant effects. It is orally active in humans, but with relatively low bioavailability.

CGS-20625 is a positive allosteric modulator at several GABAA receptors types. Due to its alicyclic moiety potency at γ1 subunit, containing receptor types is more pronounced for CGS-20625 compared to benzodiazepines. γ1 subunits are expressed at higher levels in the central amygdala.

References 

Anxiolytics
Lactams
O-methylated phenols
GABAA receptor positive allosteric modulators
Experimental drugs